María del Socorro Bustamante (17 February 1955 – 20 March 2015)  was a Colombian politician who was a Senator from 1994 to 2002.

References

1955 births
2015 deaths
20th-century Colombian women politicians
20th-century Colombian politicians
21st-century Colombian women politicians
21st-century Colombian politicians